Protein polybromo-1 (PB1) also known as BRG1-associated factor 180 (BAF180) is a protein that in humans is encoded by the PBRM1 gene.

Structure and function 

Component of the SWI/SNF-B (PBAF) chromatin-remodeling complex, which contains at least SMARCA4/BRG1, SMARCB1/SNF5/INI1/BAF47, ACTL6A/BAF53A or ACTL6B/BAF53B, SMARCE1/BAF57, SMARCD1/BAF60A, SMARCD2/BAF60B, and actin.

Chicken PB1 possesses 5 bromodomains, 2 bromo-adjacent homology (BAH) domains, and 1 truncated high-mobility group (HMG) motif. cPB1 is also homologous to yeast Rsc1, Rsc2, and Rsc4, essential proteins that are required for cell cycle progression through mitosis.

Clinical significance 

PBRM1 is a tumor suppressor gene in many cancer subtypes.  Mutations are especially prevalent in clear cell renal cell carcinoma.

References

Further reading